Horst Borcherding (8 October 1930 – 9 February 2015) was a German footballer who played as a goalkeeper.

Career
Borcherding played club football for SV Saar 05 Saarbrücken and VfL Osnabrück, and played international football for Saarland.

Later life and death
He died on 9 February 2015, at the age of 84.

References

1930 births
2015 deaths
Saar footballers
German footballers
Saarland international footballers
SV Saar 05 Saarbrücken players
VfL Osnabrück players
Association football goalkeepers
Sportspeople from Osnabrück
Footballers from Lower Saxony